Smokescreen is a 1964 British crime drama film, written and directed by Jim O'Connolly and starring Peter Vaughan.

Plot
Mr Roper, an insurance investigator, travels to Brighton to assess the apparent death of a businessman after his burning car was seen crashing over a cliff into the sea. The insurance company is suspicious, as the man had only recently taken out life insurance for a large sum. The car is recovered and no body is found. Roper and the police have to find out whether they are dealing with an accident, an insurance fraud or a murder.

Cast
 Peter Vaughan as Roper
 John Carson as Trevor Bayliss
 Yvonne Romain as Janet Dexter
 Gerald Flood as Graham Turner
 Glynn Edwards as Inspector Wright
 John Glyn-Jones as Player
 Sam Kydd as Hotel waiter
 Deryck Guyler as Station master (as Derek Guyler)
 Penny Morrell as Helen, Turner's secretary
 David Gregory as the Smudger
 Jill Curzon as June
 Barbara Hicks as Miss Breen
 Bert Palmer as Barman
 Tom Gill as Reception clerk
 Edward Ogden as Police Sergeant
 Anthony Dawes as John Dexter
 Romo Gorrara as Taxi Driver
 Maja Hafernik as Mrs Dexter's Maid
 Derek Francis as Dexter's doctor (uncredited)
 Damaris Hayman as Mrs Roper's nurse (uncredited)

Critical reception
According to the Radio Times reviewer: "this above-average programme filler has a passable plot (involving a little bit of skulduggery in suburban Brighton) that's kept moving swiftly and painlessly by director Jim O'Connolly...Vaughan plays with a dogged determination that is efficient, engaging and quite at odds with the more sinister characterisations he would essay later in his career". BFI Screenonline described the film as "an utterly charming B-film comedy-thriller that emphasises character as much as plot and makes full use of extensive location footage."

The film historians Steve Chibnall and Brian McFarlane selected Smokescreen as one of the 15 most meritorious British B films made between the Second World War and 1970. They describe it as an "uncommonly neat little insurance racket-cum-murder thriller" and praise the way that its comic relief is "built into the fabric of the film's main narrative action".

Locations
The opening scenes were shot in London, but much of the rest of the film was shot on location in West Sussex and East Sussex, including the Brighton area. The scene featuring Deryck Guyler as the station master was shot at Hellingly railway station, which has since been closed.

References

External links
 
 

1964 films
1964 crime drama films
1960s mystery films
British crime drama films
British crime thriller films
British black-and-white films
British mystery films
Films directed by Jim O'Connolly
Films set in Brighton
1960s English-language films
1960s British films